Events in the year 1895 in Japan.

Incumbents
Emperor: Emperor Meiji
Prime Minister: Itō Hirobumi

Governors
Aichi Prefecture: Tokito Konkyo
Akita Prefecture: Yasuhiko Hirayama
Aomori Prefecture: Masa Sawa
Ehime Prefecture: Chang Masaya Komaki
Fukui Prefecture: Kunizo Arakawa
Fukuoka Prefecture: Kojiro Iwasaki
Fukushima Prefecture: Yoshio Kusaka then Yasutaro Hara
Gifu Prefecture: Michio Sokabe then Sukeo Kabayama
Gunma Prefecture: Motootoko Nakamura
Hiroshima Prefecture: Baron Nabeshima Miki
Ibaraki Prefecture: Takasaki then Egi Kazuyuki
Iwate Prefecture: Ichizo Hattori
Kagawa Prefecture: Baron Umashi Obata then Ichizo Fukano
Kochi Prefecture: Ishida Eikichi
Kumamoto Prefecture: Matsudaira Masanao
Kyoto Prefecture: Baron Nobumichi Yamada
Mie Prefecture: Shangyi Narukawa
Miyagi Prefecture: Minoru Katsumata
Nagano Prefecture: Asada Tokunori
Niigata Prefecture: Baron Seung Zhi Kuwata
Oita Prefecture: Tameharu Yamada
Okinawa Prefecture: Shigeru Narahara
Osaka Prefecture: Utsumi Tadakatsu
Saga Prefecture: Teru Tanabe
Saitama Prefecture: Tomi Senketaka
Shiname Prefecture: Michio Sokabe
Tochigi Prefecture: Sato Nobu
Tokyo: Miura Yasushi
Toyama Prefecture: Tokuhisa Tsunenori
Yamagata Prefecture: Shuichi Kinoshita

Events
January 20-February 12 - Battle of Weihaiwei
January 31 - The Kyoto Electric Railway, the first electric railway in Japan, begins operation. 
March 4 - Battle of Yingkou
March 23–26 - Pescadores Campaign (1895)
May 2 – Kiyō Saving Bank, as predecessor of Kiyō Bank was established  in Wakayama Prefecture. 
May 29-October 21 - Japanese invasion of Taiwan (1895)
June 2–3 - Battle of Keelung
June 11-August 2 - Hsinchu Campaign
August 27 - Battle of Baguashan
September 25 – Bank of Ashikaga (足利銀行) was established in Tochigi Prefecture.   
October 9 - Battle of Chiayi
October 11 - Battle of Chiatung
October 19 – Nekata Bank (根方銀行), as predecessor of Suruga Bank was founded in Shizuoka Prefecture.
November 26 - Battle of Changhsing
Unknown date – Genzo Shimazu Battery Manufacturing, as predecessor of GS Yuasa was founded in Kyoto.

Births
January 19 - Isamu Cho
January 21 - Noe Itō
February 23 - Iwao Matsuda (general)
March 2 - Sanji Iwabuchi
April 26 - Enzo Matsunaga
September 18 - Tomoji Tanabe
September 25 - Masafumi Arima
November 17 - Unichi Hiratsuka
December 25 - Mitsuharu Kaneko
Heihachirō Kojima
Keiichirō Yoshino

Deaths
January 15 - Prince Arisugawa Taruhito
February 9 - Ōdera Yasuzumi
February 20 - Kōno Bairei
April 20 - Kōno Togama
November 5 - Prince Kitashirakawa Yoshihisa

References

 
1890s in Japan
Years of the 19th century in Japan